Anaerobacillus alkalidiazotrophicus is a strictly anaerobic, diazotrophic and spore-forming bacterium from the genus of Anaerobacillus which has been isolated from soil from Choibalsan in Mongolia.

References

External links 

Type strain of Anaerobacillus alkalidiazotrophicus at BacDive -  the Bacterial Diversity Metadatabase

Bacillaceae
Bacteria described in 2008